Diaphoroplax biramosus is a rare species of chiton in the family Mopaliidae.

Distribution 
New Zealand

References
 Powell A. W. B., New Zealand Mollusca, William Collins Publishers Ltd, Auckland, New Zealand 1979 

Mopaliidae
Chitons described in 1835